Charlee is an English unisex given name and nickname that is a feminine form of Charlie and a diminutive form of Charles. Notable people referred to by this name include the following:

Given name
Charlee Adams (born 1995), English male footballer
Charlee Brooks (born 1988), American female vocalist, composer, and audio engineer
Charlee Fraser (born 1995), Australian female fashion model
Charlee Johnson, American male musician
Charlee Minkin (born 1981), American female judoka

Nickname/Stagename
Charlee, stage name of Vera Luttenberger (born 1993), Austrian singer
Charlee Jacob, pen name of Nell Anne Jacob (1952 - 2019), American female author

See also

Sharlee D'Angelo
Charle (name)

Notes

English feminine given names
English masculine given names